The Bayer designation Chi Sagittarii (χ Sagittarii) is shared by three star systems in the zodiac constellation of Sagittarius.  The brightest of these, χ1 Sagittarii and χ3 Sagittarii, are separated by 0.56° on the sky. The dimmer star χ2 Sagittarii is located between them, 0.10° from χ1, and is too faint to be seen with the naked eye. In 1977, the Wow! signal came from the direction of these stars.

 χ1 Sagittarii, 47 Sgr, HR 7362
 χ2 Sagittarii, 48 Sgr
 χ3 Sagittarii, 49 Sgr, HR 7363

Name and etymology
These three χ star, together with φ Sgr, σ Sgr, ζ Sgr and τ Sgr were Al Naʽām al Ṣādirah (النعم السادرة), the Returning Ostriches. According to the catalogue of stars in the Technical Memorandum 33-507 - A Reduced Star Catalog Containing 537 Named Stars, Al Naʽām al Ṣādirah or Namalsadirah was originally the title for four stars: φ Sgr as Namalsadirah I, τ Sgr as Namalsadirah II, χ1 Sgr as Namalsadirah III and χ2 Sgr as Namalsadirah IV (except σ Sgr and ζ Sgr).

References

Sagittarii, Chi
Sagittarius (constellation)